Geobacillus toebii is a thermophilic bacterium first isolated from hay compost. It is aerobic, Gram-positive, motile and rod-shaped, with type strain SK-1(T) (= KCTC 0306BP(T) - DSM 14590(T)).

References

Further reading

Banat, R. Marchant IM. "21 The Genus Geobacillus and Hydrocarbon Utilization." (2010).

External links

LPSN
Type strain of Geobacillus toebii at BacDive -  the Bacterial Diversity Metadatabase

Bacillaceae
Bacteria described in 2002